Tillandsia diguetii is a species of flowering plant in the genus Tillandsia. This species is endemic to Mexico.

Cultivars
 Tillandsia 'Squatty Body'

References

BSI Cultivar Registry Retrieved 11 October 2009

diguetii
Endemic flora of Mexico